Ban Thi is the northernmost district (amphoe) of Lamphun province, northern Thailand.

Etymology
The district is named after the Thi River, and literally means 'Thi village'.

History
The minor district (king amphoe) Ban Thi was established on 1 April 1990, when two tambons were split off from Mueang Lamphun district. It was upgraded to a full district on 7 September 1995.

Geography
Neighboring districts are Mueang Lamphun of Lamphun Province to the south and San Kamphaeng of Chiang Mai province to the north.

The main river of the district is the Thi River, which originates in the Mae Thai mountain range in the east of the district. The river flows into the Mae Kuang River, a tributary of the Ping.

Administration
The district is divided into two sub-districts (tambons), which are further subdivided into 34 villages (muban). Ban Thi is a township (thesaban tambon) which covers the whole tambon Ban Thi. There is one tambon administrative organizations (TAO).  The sub-district of Ban Thi will be the site of the second Chiang Mai Airport.

References

External links
amphoe.com (Thai)
Banthi municipality website

Ban Thi